Nihad Gule is a Syrian painter. He was born on 7 April 1968 in Anqala, Syria.

He was a member of the Syrian Fine Arts Association and writes regularly on Fine Arts in Syrian and Arab Newspapers as an art critic.

In November 2014 he moved to Germany where he still lives and works.

He has taken part in some private expositions in the Arab World:
 An exhibition entitled "Red & Yellow" in Khanji Art Gallery, Aleppo, 1995.
 An exhibition in Fine Arts Association Gallery, Aleppo, 2000.
 An exhibition in fine Arts Association Gallery, Aleppo, 2004.
 An exhibition in Dar Al Mada Art Gallery, Damascus, 2005.
 An exhibition in Foresight Art Gallery, Amman, Jordan, 2007.

And, in Germany:
 Kulturwerkstatt in Remagen in November 2015

He was invited by Julia Klöckner, president of the CDU Rheinland-Pfalz to expose his work in the Landtag in Mainz in December 2015.

References

1968 births
Living people
Syrian painters